James (or Jim) Carey, Cary, or Carrey may refer to:

Entertainment
 James Carrey or Jim Carrey (born 1962), Canadian actor 
 James Cary (writer), British television and radio writer

Military
 James L. Carey (1839–1919), Union Army soldier and Medal of Honor recipient
 James Carey (Medal of Honor) (born ), United States Navy sailor and Medal of Honor recipient
 James J. Carey (born 1939), United States Navy admiral

Others
 James Carey (Fenian) (1845–1883), Irish rebel conspirator turned informant
 James Cary (bishop), English bishop of Coventry and Lichfield
 James F. Carey (1867–1938), American socialist politician
 James B. Carey (1911–1973), founding president of International Union of Electrical Workers
 James B. Carey (judge) (1905–1979), Justice of the Delaware Supreme Court
 James W. Carey (1934–2006), American communications theorist
 Jim Carey (ice hockey) (born 1974), American ice hockey goaltender
 Jim Carey (basketball) (1929–2006), American college basketball coach